The Maitenrehue River is a river of Chile. It flows through the north of the Araucanía Region in the center of the country.

See also
List of rivers of Chile

References
 EVALUACION DE LOS RECURSOS HIDRICOS SUPERFICIALES EN LA CUENCA DEL RIO BIO BIO

Rivers of Chile
Rivers of Araucanía Region